Babeyevo may refer to:
Babeyevo, Republic of Mordovia, a village (selo) in the Republic of Mordovia, Russia
Babeyevo, Pskov Oblast, a village in Pskov Oblast, Russia
Babeyevo, name of several other rural localities in Russia